Zaireichthys camerunensis is a species of loach catfish found in Cameroon and Guinea in the Niger River basin.  It reaches a length of 3.3 cm.  The humeral process of the pectoral girdle is short and without denticulations.  The neural and hemal spines tend to be simple and slender.

References 

 

Amphiliidae
Fish of Africa
Fish described in 1963